Yoshifumi Tajima (4 August 1918 – 10 September 2009) was an actor in Japanese kaiju films, best known for his role as Kumayama in Mothra vs. Godzilla. He was born in Kobe, Japan.

Selected filmography 

 Pu-san (1953)
 Hiroba no kodoku (1953) - Tachikawa
 Waseda daigaku (1953) - Detective
 Mitsuyu-sen (1954) - Soga
 Otsukisama ni wa warui kedo (1954)
 Ore no kenjû wa subayai (1954)
 Tenka taihei (1955)
 Ai no onimotsu (1955)
 Shônen shikeishû (1955)
 Ôkami (1955)
 Samurai II: Duel at Ichijoji Temple (1955) - Yoshioka samurai
 Yakan chûgaku (1955)
 Aijô (1956) - Tamura
 Shujinsen (1956)
 Rodan (1956) - Izeki, reporter of Seibu Nippou
 Kono futari ni sachi are (1957)
 Ninjitsu (1957)
 Zoku Ôban: Fûun hen (1957) - Yamaka
 Saigo no dasso (1957) - Chin
 Hadairo no tsuki (1957) - Jimbo
 Datsugokushû (1957)
 Zoku aoi sanmyaku Yukiko no maki (1957)
 The H-Man (1958) - Detective Sakata
 Doji o numana (1958)
 Varan the Unbelievable (1958) - Captain Maritime, Self-Defense Force
 Mikkokusha wa dare ka (1958) - Komakichi
 Jinsei gekijô - Seishun hen (1958)
 The Hidden Fortress (1958) - Potential slave buyer
 Kotan no kuchibue (1959)
 Aru kengo no shogai (1959)
 Sengoku gunto-den (1959) - Jiro's Vassal
 Aruhi watashi wa (1959) - Kitamura
 The Three Treasures (1959)
 When a Woman Ascends the Stairs (1960)
 Secret of the Telegian (1960) - Syôgen Ryû - Cabaret Owner
 Hawai Middowei daikaikûsen: Taiheiyô no arashi (1960)
 Salary man Mejiro Sanpei: Teishu no tameiki no maki (1960) - Shibata
 Fundoshi isha (1960) - Seibei
 Man Against Man (1960) - Taro
 The Bad Sleep Well (1960) - Reporter B
 Dokuritsu gurentai nishi-e (1960)
 Oneechan wa tsuiteru ze (1960) - Kurosuke Harano
 The Human Vapor (1960) - Sergeant
 Mothra (1961) - Military Advisor
 Kurenai no umi (1961)
 Ankokugai gekimetsu meirei (1961) - Tagami
 Kurenai no sora (1962)
 Doburoku no Tatsu (1962) - Numajiri
 King Kong vs. Godzilla (1962) - Captain of Fujita's Ship - Japanese version only
 Chūshingura: Hana no Maki, Yuki no Maki (1962) - Shuzen Wakisaka
 Attack Squadron! (1963) - Sailor
 High and Low (1963) - Chief Prison Officer
 Sengoku yarô (1963)
 500,000 (1963) - Yasumoto
 Hiken (1963)
 Norainu sakusen (1963)
 Oneechan sandai-ki (1963) - Kawakami
 Atragon (1963) - Tome 'Amano' Amanoshome
 Mothra vs. Godzilla (1964) - Kumayama
 Nippon ichi no horafuki otoko (1964) - Coach
 Dogara, the Space Monster (1964) - Gangster Tada
 Hana no oedo no musekinin (1964)
 Ghidorah, the Three-Headed Monster (1964) - Ship Captain
 Samurai Assassin (1965) - Samurai
 Ankokugai gekitotsu sakusen (1965) - Cop
 Hi no ataru isu (1965) - Tanaami
 Tameki no taisho (1965) - Ishida
 Frankenstein vs. Baragon (1965) - Submarine Commander Murata
 Invasion of Astro-Monster (1965) - General
 Rise Against the Sword (1966) - Shozaemon Ube
 Hikinige (1966)
 Ultra Q (1966-1967, TV Series) - Daily News Editor Seki
 The War of the Gargantuas (1966) - Police Officer
 Retsu go! Wakadaishô (1967)
 Râkugoyarô-Daibakushô (1967) - Jurozaemon Mizuno
 Zoku izuko e (1967) - Assistant Schoolmaster
 King Kong Escapes (1967) - Henchman
 Japan's Longest Day (1967) - Colonel Watanabe - CO Imperial Guards 1st Infantry Regiment
 Scattered Clouds (1967)
 Kimi ni shiawase o - Sentimental boy (1967) - Momoo Maura
 Destroy All Monsters (1968) - Major Tada
 Isoroku (1968) - Air Force officer
 Kureji no buchamukure daihakken (1969)
 Battle of the Japan Sea (1969) - Ijichi
 Konto 55go: Jinrui no daijakuten (1969)
 All Monsters Attack (1969) - Detective 
The Militarists (1970) - Seiichi Itō
 Batsugun joshikôsei: 16 sai wa kanjichau (1970) - Ôta
 Showa hito keta shachô tai futaketa shain (1971)
 Ningen kakumei (1973)
 The Bullet Train (1975) - Sasaki
 Zoku ningen kakumei (1976)
 Nippon no Don: Yabohen (1977)
 The Return of Godzilla (1984) - Environmental Director General Hidaka
 Godzilla 1985 (1985) - Environmental Director General Hidaka (final film role)

References

External links

Mention of Yoshifumi Tajima's death

1918 births
2009 deaths
Japanese male film actors